Baba Adinni is a Yoruba chiefly title. It is often conferred by local obas in Nigeria's Yorubaland region, usually to Muslim men who have contributed to society or government in some fashion.

List of Baba Adinni
 Abdul Hafeez A. Abou

See also
Oba (ruler)
Nigerian traditional rulers

Yoruba history
Nigerian traditional rulers